The Association of MBAs (AMBA) has accredited MBA, DBA and MBM programmes at 277 graduate business schools in 57 countries and territories. Some of the accredited institutions offer programs in a further 33 countries, which expands AMBA's global presence to 85 countries. The list of 55 countries/territories below shows only the home countries of the 261 accredited business schools.

United Kingdom 
 London Business School, University of London
 Imperial College Business School, Imperial College London
 Bayes Business School, City, University of London
 UCL School of Management, University College London, University of London 
 Brunel Business School, Brunel University London
Cardiff Business School, Cardiff University
 Henley Business School, University of Reading
 Kent Business School
 Kingston Business School, Kingston University London
 Southampton Business School, University of Southampton
 Surrey Business School, University of Surrey
 The Open University Business School
 University of Bath School of Management
 University of Exeter Business School
 Warwick Business School, University of Warwick
 Aston Business School, Aston University
 Birmingham Business School, University of Birmingham
 Cranfield School of Management
 Norwich Business School, University of East Anglia
 Nottingham University Business School
 Oxford Brookes University Business School
 Aberdeen Business School, Robert Gordon University
 Adam Smith Business School, University of Glasgow
 Alliance Manchester Business School, University of Manchester
 Durham University Business School
 Hull University Business School
 Lancaster University Management School
 Leeds University Business School
 Loughborough University School of Business and Economics
 Manchester Metropolitan University Business School
 Newcastle University Business School
 Sheffield University Management School
 University of Bradford School of Management
 University of Edinburgh Business School
 University of Leicester School of Management
 Strathclyde Business School, University of Strathclyde
 Essex Business School, University of Essex
 University of Liverpool Management School, University of Liverpool
 University of Sussex Business School

Argentina 
 IAE Universidad Austral
 Pontifical Catholic University of Argentina
 Torcuato di Tella University
 University of CEMA
 University of San Andrés

Australia
 Macquarie Business School, Macquarie University
 QUT Business School, Queensland University of Technology
 Monash University Faculty of Business and Economics
 University of Sydney Business School

Austria
 WU Executive Academy

Belgium
 Antwerp Management School
 Solvay Brussels School of Economics and Management
 Vlerick Leuven Gent Management School

Brazil
 Fundação Dom Cabral
 Getulio Vargas Foundation (FGV)
 Insper - Institute of Education and Research, São Paulo 
 Institute of Management Foundation, University of São Paulo (FIA)

Canada
 HEC Montreal
 Schulich School of Business
 Telfer School of Management

Chile
 Adolfo Ibáñez University
 Universidad de Chile
 Universidad del Desarrollo
 UDP - Universidad Diego Portales
 Universidad Tecnica Federico Santa Maria
 University of the Andes, Chile (ESE - Escuela de Negocios)

China
 Antai College of Economics and Management, Shanghai Jiao Tong University
 Beijing Institute of Technology
Beijing Jiaotong University
 Central South University Business School
 Central University of Finance and Economics
 Chongqing University
 Donlinks School of Economics and Management, University of Science and Technology Beijing
 East China University of Science and Technology, School of Business (ECUST)
 Guangdong University of Foreign Studies, School of Business
 Harbin Institute of Technology, School of Management (HIT)
 Hohai University Business School
 Huazhong University of Science and Technology, School of Management (HUST)
 Hunan University Business School
 Jinan University
 Lanzhou University School of Management
 Lingnan (University) College
 Nankai University
 Peking University HSBC Business School
School of Economics and Management (SEM), Dalian University of Technology (DUT)
 Shanghai University
 Shanghai University of Finance and Economics, College of Business (SUFE)
 South China University of Technology, School of Business Administration (SCUT)
 Southwest Jiaotong University, School of Economics and Management
 Sun Yat-Sen University Business School
 Tianjin University
 Tianjin University of Finance and Economics Business School 
 Tongji University, School of Economics and Management
 University of Chinese Academy of Sciences, School of Management
 University of Electronic Science and Technology of China School of Management and Economics (UESTC)
UIBE Business School, University of International Business and Economics
 University of Science and Technology of China School of Management
 Wuhan University, School of Economics and Management
 Xiamen University
 Zhejiang University of Technology College of Economics and Management
 Zhejiang University, School of Management
 Zhongnan University of Economics and Law
 International Business School, Suzhou Xi’an Jiaotong Liverpool University
 Faculty of Business, University of Macau
 Glorious Sun School of Business and Management, Donghua University 
 MBA School, Zhejiang Gongshang University 
 Chinese University of Mining and Technology (CUMT)
 School of Business, Jiangnan University 
School of Business and Management, Shanghai International Studies University

Colombia
 EAFIT University
 INALDE Business School, Universidad de la Sabana
 Universidad del Norte, Colombia
 School of Business & Economic Studies, Universidad Icesi
 Universidad de los Andes
 Universidad Externado de Colombia

Costa Rica 
 INCAE Business School

Croatia 
 Cotrugli Business School

Czech Republic 
 Faculty of Business Administration (FBA), Prague University of Economics and Business (VSE)

Denmark
 AVT Business School
 Copenhagen Business School
 School of Business and Social Sciences, Aarhus University
 Technical University of Denmark

Ecuador 
 ESPAE Graduate School of Management, ESPOL Escuela Superior Politecnica del Litoral 
 IDE Business School, Universidad de los Hemisferios 
 USFQ Business School, Universidad San Francisco de Quito

Egypt
 AUC - The American University in Cairo

Fiji
 University of the South Pacific, Graduate School of Business

Finland
 Aalto University School of Business
 Hanken School of Economics
 Jyväskylä University School of Business and Economics

France
 Audencia Business School
 EM Strasbourg Business School
 École des Ponts Business School
 EDHEC Business School
 EMLYON Business School
 ESC Clermont Business School
 ESC Rennes
 ESSCA School of Management 
 ESSEC Business School
 Excelia Business School
 Grenoble Graduate School of Business, Grenoble École de Management
 HEC Paris
 IESEG School of Management
 ICN Business School
 INSEAD
 Institut Mines-Télécom Business School
 Kedge Business School
 INSEEC Business School
 Le CNAM, International Institute of Management
 ISC Paris Business School
 Montpellier Business School
 NEOMA Business School
 Paris School of Business
 TBS
 Ecole de Management Léonard De Vinci

Germany
 Frankfurt School of Finance & Management
 Berlin Professional School, Berlin School of Economics and Law
 ESMT European School of Management and Technology
 GISMA Business School
 Mannheim Business School
 Sahjanand Arts and commerce college
 TUM School of Management

Greece
 ALBA Graduate Business School
 Athens University of Economics and Business (AUEB)
 CITY College, International Faculty of the University of Sheffield

Hong Kong
 Chinese University of Hong Kong (CUHK)
 Hong Kong Baptist University, School of Business

Hungary 
 Central European University
 Corvinus University of Budapest

Iceland
 Reykjavik University School of Business

India
 Goa Institute of Management
 Indian School of Business
 Great Lakes Institute of Management, Chennai / Gurgaon
 IMI New Delhi
 IMI Bhubaneswar
 Indian Institute of Management Calcutta
 Indian Institute of Management Indore
 Indian Institute of Management Kozhikode
 Indian Institute of Management Tiruchirappalli
 Indian Institute of Management Lucknow
 Indian Institute of Management Rohtak
 MDI Management Development Institute
 NMIMS School of Business Management, Hyderabad / Bangalore
 SP Jain Institute of Management & Research
 XLRI Xavier School of Management
 T. A. Pai Management Institute

Indonesia 
 Faculty of Economics and Business, University of Indonesia

Ireland
 Cork University Business School, University College Cork
 DCU Business School, Dublin City University
 DIT College of Business Graduate Business School
 J.E. Cairnes School of Business & Economics, NUI Galway
 Kemmy Business School, University of Limerick
Queen’s Management School, Queen’s University Belfast
 Trinity College Dublin School of Business
 UCD Michael Smurfit Graduate Business School, University College Dublin

Italy
 MIB - School of Management
 Luiss Business School
 SDA Bocconi School of Management
 MIP Politecnico di Milano

Jamaica
 Mona School of Business, The University of the West Indies, Kingston

Japan
 NUCB Business School, Nagoya University of Commerce & Business
 Ritsumeikan Asia Pacific University

Kazakhstan 
 Almaty Management University

Lebanon 
 ESA Lebanon

Luxembourg 
 Business Science Institute Luxembourg

Malaysia
 University of Malaya
 Universiti Utara Malaysia

Mexico
 EGADE Business School
 IPADE Business School, Universidad Panamericana
 ITAM Instituto Tecnológico Autónomo de México
 Universidad Anahuac, Facultad de Economía y Negocios
 Universidad de Monterrey, Facultad de Economía y Negocios

Monaco
 International University of Monaco

Morocco
 Ecole Hassania des Travaux Publics
 ISCAE

Netherlands
 University of Amsterdam Faculty of Economics and Business
 Maastricht School of Management
 Maastricht University School of Business and Economics
 Nyenrode Business Universiteit
 Rotterdam School of Management
 TIAS School for Business and Society

New Zealand
 Massey University
 The University of Waikato Management School
 University of Auckland Business School
 University of Canterbury
 Victoria University of Wellington

Nigeria 
 Lagos Business School

Norway
 BI Norwegian Business School
 NHH Norwegian School of Economics

Peru
 CENTRUM Catolica
 ESAN Graduate School of Business
 Universidad del Pacifico
 Universidad de Piura - PAD Escuela de Direccion

Poland
Faculty of Economic Sciences and Management, Nicolaus Copernicus University 
Faculty of Management, University of Warsaw 
 Gdańsk University of Technology
 Kozminski University
 Poznan University of Economics
 SGH Warsaw School of Economics
 University of Warsaw Faculty of Management

Portugal
 AESE Business School 
 Católica Lisbon School of Business & Economics
 Católica Porto Business School
 INDEG-ISCTE Executive Education, Instituto Universitário de Lisboa
 ISEG Lisbon School of Economics and Management, Universidade de Lisboa
 Nova School of Business and Economics
 Porto Business School

Russia
 Faculty of International MBA Programs, Institute for Social Sciences, RANEPA 
 GSCM Graduate School of Corporate Management
 Higher Business School, State University of Management
 Institute of Business Studies, RANEPA
Institute of Industry Management, RANEPA 
Institute of Public Administration and Civil Service (IPACS), RANEPA 
 International Institute of Management LINK
 International Management Institute of St. Petersburg (IMISP)
 Kazan Federal University MBA Higher School
 Moscow State Institute of International Relations (MGIMO)
 MIRBIS Moscow International Higher Business School
 Plekhanov Business School Integral, Plekhanov Russian University of Economics
 Saint Petersburg State University Graduate School of Management
 Synergy Business School, Synergy University

Singapore
 Singapore Management University (SMU)

Slovenia
 IEDC Bled School of Management
 University of Ljubljana, Faculty of Economics

South Africa
 Gordon Institute of Business Science, University of Pretoria
 Nelson Mandela Metropolitan University Business School
 School of Business and Governance, North-West University
 Rhodes Business School, Rhodes University
 University of Cape Town Graduate School of Business
 University of Stellenbosch Business School
 Wits Business School, University of the Witwatersrand
 Milpark Business School

Spain
 Barcelona School of Management, Pompeu Fabra University (UPF BSM)
Deusto Business School, University of Deusto
 EADA - Escuela de Alta Direccion y Administracion
 ESADE Business School
 IE Business School
 Universidad Carlos III de Madrid
 ESIC Business & Marketing School

Sweden
 School of Business, Economics and Law, University of Gothenburg
 School of Economics and Management, Lund University
 Stockholm Business School, Stockholm University

Switzerland
 EPFL - École Polytechnique Fédérale de Lausanne
 Geneva School of Economics and Management, Université de Genève
 HEC Lausanne, University of Lausanne
 IMD Business School
 University of St. Gallen

Thailand
 Thammasat Business School, Thammasat University

Trinidad & Tobago
 Arthur Lok Jack Graduate School of Business, The University of the West Indies

Tunisia
 Mediterranean School of Business

Turkey 
 Graduate School of Business, Koç University

Ukraine
 IIB - International Institute of Business
 International Management Institute (MIM-Kyiv)

Uruguay
 Facultad de Administracion y Ciencias Sociales (FACS)
 Instituto de Estudios Empresariales de Montevideo (IEEM)

United States
 Hult International Business School
 Miami Herbert Business School at the University of Miami
 Olin Business School at Washington University in St. Louis

Venezuela
 Instituto de Estudios Superiores de Administración

See also
 Association of MBAs
 Triple accreditation

References

School accreditors
Lists of universities and colleges